Ante Starčević Square is the central square of the city of Osijek, Croatia, named after Ante Starčević. It is colloquially referred to as Trg ("the square"). It has the shape of an isosceles right angle triangle.

It is located in the center of Osijek on the intersection of Josip Juraj Strossmayer Street from the west, the small street Ribarska from the north, Kapucinska Street from the east and Županijska Street from the south.

Important buildings 
 Normann Palace (The seat of government of Osijek-Baranja County)
 Hotel Central

External links 

Squares in Croatia
Osijek